Salaheddine Sbaï (born 21 August 1985 in Sidi Kacem) is a Moroccan former professional footballer.

Club career
Sbaï began his career for the youth side at Charleroi and was loaned out for the 2004/2005 season to Ronse. After only five games in the 2004/2005 season for Ronse, he turned back to Charleroi, the club loaned him again to another club and signed a two-year loan deal with Tubize. After forty-eight games, where he scored one goal for Tubize, he returned to Charleroi in August 2008.

On 24 June 2009 Nîmes Olympique signed the defender from Charleroi alongside forward Yohan Bocognano from AC Ajaccio and forward Abdelmounaïm El Hajaoui from FC Sete.

On 27 January 2011, Sbaï signed for English club Blackpool on loan until the end of the season, with a view to a further twelve-month loan, as cover for Stephen Crainey and David Carney. He attended the match against Manchester United and trained with the first team on 27 January. However, he did not make a single appearance for the Tangerines and was released at the end of the season, following Blackpool's relegation from the Premier League.

International career
Sbaï is a former U-21 international for Morocco. He received his first cap for Morocco national football team in the 2010 FIFA World Cup qualification match against Mauritania on 11 October 2008.

Personal life
Sbaï's brothers, Amine and Hatim Sbaï are also professional footballers.

References

External links

 

Moroccan footballers
1985 births
Living people
A.F.C. Tubize players
Morocco under-20 international footballers
Morocco international footballers
Moroccan expatriate footballers
R. Charleroi S.C. players
Nîmes Olympique players
Blackpool F.C. players
Raja CA players
Association football defenders
People from Sidi Kacem
Challenger Pro League players
Belgian Pro League players
Ligue 2 players
Expatriate footballers in France
Moroccan expatriate sportspeople in France
Lyon La Duchère players